The Midwestern Greenhouse Gas Reduction Accord (Midwestern Accord) is a regional agreement by six governors of states in the US Midwest who are members of the Midwestern Governors Association (MGA), and the premier of one Canadian province, whose purpose is to reduce greenhouse gas emissions to combat climate change.  The accord has been inactive since March 2010, when an advisory group presented a plan for action to the association with a scheduled implementation date of January 2012. Signatories to the accord are the US states of Minnesota, Wisconsin, Illinois,  Iowa, Michigan, Kansas,  and the Canadian Province of Manitoba. Observers of the accord are Indiana, Ohio, and South Dakota, as well as the Canadian Province of Ontario.

While the Midwest has intensive manufacturing and agriculture sectors, making it the most coal-dependent region in North America, it also has significant renewable energy resources and is particularly vulnerable to the climate change caused by burning coal and other fossil fuels. 

The Midwestern Accord was the fourth tier of the MGA Energy Security and Climate Stewardship Summit Platform, signed on November 15, 2007. It established the Midwestern Greenhouse Gas Reduction Program, which aimed to:
  establish greenhouse gas reduction targets and time frames consistent with signing states' targets;
  develop a market-based and multi-sector cap and trade mechanism to help achieve those reduction targets;
  establish a system to enable tracking, management, and crediting for entities that reduce greenhouse gas emissions; and
  develop and implement additional steps as needed to achieve the reduction targets, such as a low-carbon fuel standards and regional incentives and funding mechanisms.

Through the Midwestern Accord, the governors agreed to establish a Midwestern greenhouse gas reduction program to reduce greenhouse gas emissions in their states, as well as a working group to provide recommendations regarding the implementation of the accord. In June 2009, the Midwestern Greenhouse Gas Reduction Accord Advisory Group finalized its draft recommendations. In March 2010 the advisory group presented a plan to the MGA that called for implementation beginning in January 2012. No further action was taken, as leadership in several of the states switched positions on climate policy.

In July 2014, accord member Kansas and observers Indiana, South Dakota, and Ohio joined a lawsuit opposing the EPA Clean Power Plan, federal climate regulations which could be met by implementation of the accord.

See also

 Intergovernmental Panel on Climate Change
 List of climate change initiatives
 The Climate Registry
 Regional Greenhouse Gas Initiative
 Western Climate Initiative

References

External links
 Midwestern Greenhouse Gas Reduction Accord Web site
 MGA Energy Initiatives
 Midwestern Greenhouse Gas Accord 2007
 MGA Energy Security and Climate Stewardship Platform for the Midwest

United States interstate compacts
Environment of Canada
Carbon finance
Greenhouse gas emissions in the United States